Tom Hazelmyer (born 1965) is an American musician and printmaker. He is known as the founder and owner of the independent label Amphetamine Reptile Records as well as being the lead vocalist and songwriter for the band Halo of Flies.

Biography 
Tom Hazelmyer was born and raised in Michigan before moving with his family to Minneapolis in 1980 when he was fourteen. During his youth, Hazelmyer worked in a foundry and performed in several punk rock bands during his free time. In 1983, after becoming disenchanted with the underground punk scene, he opted to enlist in the Marines and was eventually stationed near Seattle, Washington. It was there he established his own record label Amphetamine Reptile with the intention of issuing albums by his band Halo of Flies, who had already been turned down by several recording labels.

References

External links 
 

1965 births
American male singers
American rock guitarists
American male guitarists
American rock singers
Living people
Singers from Michigan
Guitarists from Michigan
20th-century American guitarists
20th-century American male musicians